The Copa del Generalísimo 1964 Final was the 62nd final of the King's Cup. The final was played at Santiago Bernabéu in Madrid, on 5 July 1964, being won by Club Atlético de Madrid, who beat Real Zaragoza CD 1-0.

Details

References

1964
Copa
Atlético Madrid matches
Real Zaragoza matches